The Sporidiobolales are an order of fungi in the Microbotryomycetes class of the Basidiomycota. The order contains a single family, the Sporidiobolaceae, which in turn contains seven genera and 83 species. Three of these genera, Aessosporon, Rogersiomyces, and Sporidiobolus, are classified in the Sporidiobolaceae, while the remaining four, Ballistosporomyces, Rhodosporidium, Rhodotorula, and Sporobolomyces, are incertae sedis with respect to familial placement.

References

 
Basidiomycota orders